Lucy Corin is an American novelist and short story writer. The winner of the 2012 American Academy of Arts and Letters John Guare Writer's Fund Rome Prize, Corin was awarded a National Endowment for the Arts creative writing fellowship in 2015.

Writing 
Her collection of short stories, One Hundred Apocalypses and Other Apocalypses, was published by McSweeney's in 2013.  Bustle wrote: "Corin caters to our fascination with neuroses and habits, and by exaggerating aspects of our thought processes and societal quirks, she leaves us thinking deeply about parts of humanity we don't often examine under a magnifying glass."  A review by Jonathan Deuel in the Los Angeles Review of Books read: "The dreamy, fairy-tale qualities and allegorical ambitions of these stories are tempered with sophistication and terror, making One Hundred Apocalypses and Other Apocalypses ageless...I'm frightened by Corin.  I'm dazzled by her writing."

Corin's second novel, The Swank Hotel, (2021) explores madness, generational trauma, and cultural breakdown.   An early review in Publishers Weekly noted her  "limber voice" and stated that The Swank Hotel "brims with genuine depth and humor."

Corin's stories have appeared in The Mid-American Review, Conjunctions, Tin House, Ploughshares, PEN America, and the Iowa Review. She is anthologized in the 1994 Iowa Anthology of Innovative Fiction and both the 1997 and 2003 editions of New Stories From the South and "Madmen," originally published in "One Hundred Apocalypses," was included in the 2015 anthology, New American Stories, edited by Ben Marcus.  Her novel, Everyday Psychokillers: A History for Girls was published in 2004 by FC2. Her short story collection, The Entire Predicament was published in 2007 by Tin House Books.

She is the Program Director for the University of California, Davis Creative Writing Program.

Selected awards and recognition
National Endowment for the Arts, Creative writing fellowship, 2015 
American Academy of Arts and Letters John Guare Writer's Fund Rome Prize, 2012
Yaddo Residency, 2010
Margaret Bridgman Fellow in Fiction, Bread Loaf Writers’ Conference, 2008
Walter E. Dakin Fellow, Sewanee Writers’ Conference, 2006

Bibliography
The Swank Hotel, Graywolf, 2021 
100 Apocalypses and Other Apocalypses (short story collection) McSweeney's, September 2013 
 The Entire Predicament (short story collection) Portland, OR: Tin House Books. 2007 
 Everyday Psychokillers: A History for Girls Tallahassee: FC2. 2004

Further reading 
Lucy Corin's Essay at Largehearted Boy: Book Notes
Seven Small Apocalypses, PEN.org
Excerpt from The Entire Predicament

References

External links 
LucyCorin.com - Official Website and Blog

20th-century American novelists
University of California, Davis faculty
Year of birth missing (living people)
Living people
21st-century American novelists
American women novelists
20th-century American women writers
21st-century American women writers
20th-century American short story writers
21st-century American short story writers
People from Chicago